James Belich may refer to:
James Belich (historian) (born 1956), New Zealand historian
Sir Jim Belich (1927–2015), mayor of Wellington
T. James Belich (born 1976), American playwright and actor